The Jesse Powell Towers are a residential apartment highrise at 1010 Wolfe Street in Little Rock, Arkansas.  Built in 1975, it is a nine-story skyscraper, with a steel frame clad in brick and concrete, housing 169 residential units.  It was designed by Stowers & Stowers for the city as public senior housing, and exemplifies a design principle espoused by Le Corbusier known as the "tower in a park", with a large landscaped green area surrounding the building.

The apartments were listed on the National Register of Historic Places in 2017.

See also
National Register of Historic Places listings in Little Rock, Arkansas

References

Apartment buildings on the National Register of Historic Places in Arkansas
International style architecture in Arkansas
Residential buildings completed in 1975
Houses in Little Rock, Arkansas
National Register of Historic Places in Little Rock, Arkansas
1975 establishments in Arkansas